Blasé may refer to:

 Blasé (album), an album by Archie Shepp
 "Blasé" (song), a 2015 song by Ty Dolla Sign